Sahmyook Medical Center (formerly Seoul Adventist Hospital) is a large private hospital located in Seoul, South Korea. It admits more than 30,000 patients per year. Sahmyook Medical Center also houses the Sahmyook Children's Hospital, Proton Treatment Center, Transplantation Institute & Liver Center. It is owned and operated by the Korean Union Conference of the Seventh-day Adventist Church.

The hospital is the base for the nursing course offered by the Sahmyook University.

See also 

 List of Seventh-day Adventist hospitals
 List of hospitals in South Korea
 Sahmyook University
 Sahmyook Foods
 Sahmyook Language School

References

External links 
 Sahmyook Medical Center

Hospitals affiliated with the Seventh-day Adventist Church
Hospitals established in 1908
1908 establishments in Korea